Recep Burak Yılmaz (born 27 November 1995), is a Turkish professional footballer who plays as a centre-back for Hatayspor.

Professional career
Yılmaz is a youth product of Fenerbahçe, Kartalspor and Galatasaray. He signed his first professional contract with Galatasaray in 2014, and the following season moved on loan with Kartalspor where he began his senior career. He signed permanently with Kartalspor for the 2016–2017 season. The following year, he moved to Sancaktepe where he was the starter for 3 seasons. He moved to Samsunspor in the TFF Second League in 2020, and helped them win the league in his first season with them. The following season, he joined Manisa on loan where he again won the TFF Second League before returning to Samsunspor. He was a starter for Samsunspor in the TFF First League upon his return, but early in the season had a season-ending toe surgery. On 16 June 2022, he transferred to Hatayspor signing a 3-year contract. He made his professional debut with Hatayspor in a 1–0 Süper Lig loss to Kasımpaşa on 28 August 2022.

Honours
Samsunspor
TFF Second League: 2019–20

Manisa
TFF Second League: 2020–21

References

External links
 
 

1995 births
Living people
People from Üsküdar
Turkish footballers
Hatayspor footballers
Samsunspor footballers
Kartalspor footballers
Galatasaray S.K. footballers
Süper Lig players
TFF First League players
TFF Second League players
TFF Third League players
Association football defenders
Footballers from Istanbul